HD DVD (short for High Definition Digital Versatile Disc) is an obsolete high-density optical disc format for storing data and playback of high-definition video. Supported principally by Toshiba, HD DVD was envisioned to be the successor to the standard DVD format.

HD DVD employed a blue laser with a shorter wavelength (with the exception of the 3× DVD and HD REC variants), and it stored about 3.2 times as much data per layer as its predecessor (maximum capacity: 15 GB per layer compared to 4.7 GB per layer on a DVD). The format was commercially released in 2006 and fought a protracted format war with rival Blu-ray. On February 19, 2008, Toshiba abandoned the format, announcing it would no longer manufacture HD DVD players and drives. The HD DVD Promotion Group was dissolved on March 28, 2008.

The HD DVD physical disc specifications (but not the codecs) were used as the basis for the China Blue High-definition Disc (CBHD) formerly called CH-DVD.

History
In the late 1990s, commercial HDTV sets started to enter a larger market, but there was no inexpensive way to record or play back HD content. JVC's D-VHS and Sony's HDCAM formats could store that amount of data, but were neither popular nor well-known. It was well known that using lasers with shorter wavelengths would yield optical storage with higher density. Shuji Nakamura invented practical blue laser diodes, but a lengthy patent lawsuit delayed commercial introduction.

Origins and competition from Blu-ray Disc
Sony started two projects applying the new diodes: UDO (Ultra Density Optical) and DVR Blue together with Philips, a format of rewritable discs which would eventually become Blu-ray Disc (more specifically, BD-RE) and later on with Pioneer a format of read only discs (BD-ROM). The two formats share several technologies (such as the AV codecs and the laser diode). In February 2002, the project was officially announced as Blu-ray Disc, and the Blu-ray Disc Association was founded by the nine initial members.

The DVD Forum (chaired by Sony) was deeply split over whether to go with the more expensive blue lasers or not. Although today's Blu-ray Discs appear virtually identical to a standard DVD, when the Blu-ray Discs were initially developed they required a protective caddy to avoid mis-handling by the consumer (early CD-Rs also featured a protective caddy for the same purpose.) The Blu-ray Disc prototype's caddy was both expensive and physically different from DVD, posing several problems. In March 2002, the forum voted to approve a proposal endorsed by Warner Bros. and other motion picture studios that involved compressing HD content onto dual-layer DVD-9 discs. In spite of this decision, the DVD Forum's Steering Committee announced in April that it was pursuing its own blue-laser high-definition solution. In August, Toshiba and NEC announced their competing standard Advanced Optical Disc. It was adopted by the DVD forum and renamed to HD DVD the next year.

The HD DVD Promotion Group was a group of manufacturers and media studios formed to exchange thoughts and ideas to help promote the format worldwide. Its members comprised Toshiba as the Chair Company and Secretary, Memory-Tech Corporation and NEC as Vice-Chair companies, and Sanyo Electric as Auditors; there were 61 general members and 72 associate members in total. The HD DVD promotion group was officially dissolved on March 28, 2008, following Toshiba's announcement on February 19, 2008 that it would no longer develop or manufacture HD DVD players and drives.

Attempts to avoid a format war

Much like the videotape format war between VHS and Betamax, HD DVD was competing with a rival format, Blu-ray Disc.

In an attempt to avoid a costly format war, the Blu-ray Disc Association and DVD Forum attempted to negotiate a compromise in early 2005. One of the issues was that Blu-ray Disc companies wanted to use a Java-based platform for interactivity (BD-J based on Sun Microsystems' Java TV standards), while HD DVD companies wanted to use Microsoft's "iHD" (which became HDi). Another problem was the physical formats of the discs themselves. The negotiations proceeded slowly and ultimately stalled.

On August 22, 2005, the Blu-ray Disc Association and DVD Forum announced that the negotiations to unify their standards had failed. Rumors surfaced that talks had stalled; publicly, the same reasons of physical format incompatibility were cited. By the end of September that year, Microsoft and Intel jointly announced their support for HD DVD.

Hewlett-Packard (HP) attempted to broker a compromise between the Blu-ray Disc Association and Microsoft by demanding that Blu-ray Disc use Microsoft's HDi instead of BD-J and threatening to support HD DVD instead. The Blu-ray Disc Association did not agree to HP's demands.

Launch

On March 31, 2006, Toshiba released their first consumer-based HD DVD player in Japan at ¥110,000 (US$934). HD DVD was released in the United States on April 18, 2006, with players priced at $499 and $799.

The first HD DVD titles were released on April 18, 2006. They were The Last Samurai, Million Dollar Baby, and The Phantom of the Opera by Warner Home Video and Serenity by Universal Studios. The first independent HD film released on HD DVD was One Six Right.

Sales developments

In December 2006 Toshiba reported that roughly 120,000 Toshiba branded HD DVD players had been sold in the United States, along with 150,000 HD DVD add-on units for the Xbox 360.

On April 17, 2007, one year after the first HD DVD titles were released, the HD DVD group reported that they had sold 100,000 dedicated HD DVD units in the United States.

In the middle of 2007, the first HD DVD Recorders were released in Japan.

In November 2007, the Toshiba HD-A2 was the first high definition player to be sold at a sale price of less than US$100; this was done through several major retailers to make room for the new HD-A3 models. These closeout sales lasted less than a day each due to both limited quantities and high demand at that price point. In the same month, the HD DVD promotion group announced that 750,000 HD DVD players had been sold, which included stand-alone players and the Xbox 360 add-on.

In January 2008 Toshiba announced that close to one million dedicated HD DVD players had been sold.

As of June 24, 2008, 475 HD DVD titles had been released in the US. As of April 29, 2008, 236 HD DVD titles had been released in Japan. Approximately 232 were released in the UK.

Decline
On January 4, 2008, citing consumer confusion and indifference as a reason for lackluster high-definition software sales, Warner Bros. publicly announced it would stop supporting HD DVD by June 2008, and the company would release HD titles only on Blu-ray Disc. This was followed by news of Netflix phasing out support for the format, and Best Buy's decision to recommend Blu-ray Disc over HD DVD in its retail locations and to remove HD DVD players as part of its ongoing "HDTV advantage" promotion. Finally, retailer Wal-Mart announced that it would be supporting only Blu-ray Disc by June 2008. 

On February 19, 2008, Toshiba announced plans to discontinue development, marketing and manufacturing of HD DVD players while still providing product support and after-sale service to consumers of the format (including firmware updates), effectively making the platform obsolete. The company cited "recent major changes in the market". Shipments of HD DVD machines to retailers were reduced and eventually stopped by the end of March 2008. Toshiba later revealed that they lost about $986 million on the format's failure.

End of releases
The final HD DVD major-studio releases in the United States were Paramount's Into the Wild, Warner's P.S. I Love You and Twister, on May 27, 2008. In June, the final HD DVD, Freedom: 6, was released by Bandai Visual, which acknowledged the demise of HD DVD, but stated that it wanted to complete the release of the seven-part Freedom Project, of which six parts had been released. The seventh part, due for August 2008, never saw a release. Disco Pigs was announced but postponed, with no new date announced for release. Pan's Labyrinth is also notable as New Line Cinema's only film to be released on HD DVD, as the studio quickly shifted to Blu-ray.

Death Proof was released on HD DVD format as a special-release steelbook by Senator Films in Germany on December 15, 2008.

On April 3, 2010, Engadget reported that Anthem Films would release the film Deadlands 2: Trapped on HD DVD in a limited run of 500 copies. This eventually happened in the form of HD DVD-Rs. Deadlands: The Rising, announced on September 5, 2010, was released on HD DVD in limited numbers. As with the previously released Deadlands 2: Trapped, the film was pressed on HD DVD-R disc.

Warner Blu-ray Disc replacements in the U.S.
In mid-2009, Warner offered to replace any HD DVD Warner home video release with a Blu-ray Disc equivalent for $4.95, plus $6.95 shipping to the contiguous United States or $8.95 to Alaska, Hawaii or Puerto Rico. The deal required the HD DVD's original sleeve art to be returned to Warner as proof of purchase. The turnaround time for processing was approximately two weeks. Multi-disc sets were exchangeable at a discount, such as $14.95 for the five-disc Blade Runner release rather than $24.75. No exchanges were offered to customers outside the United States.

Technical specifications
The current specification books for HD DVD are listed at the DVD FLLC website.

Disc structure
HD DVD-ROM, HD DVD-R and HD DVD-RW have a single-layer capacity of 15 GB, and a dual-layer capacity of 30 GB. HD DVD-RAM has a single-layer capacity of 20 GB. Like the original DVD format, the data layer of an HD DVD is 0.6 mm below the surface to physically protect the data layer from damage. The numerical aperture of the optical pick-up head is 0.65, compared with 0.6 for DVD. All HD DVD players are backward compatible with DVD and CD.

Recording speed

File systems
As with previous optical disc formats, HD DVD supports several file systems, such as ISO 9660 and Universal Disk Format (UDF). All HD DVD titles use UDF version 2.5 as the file system. In this file system, multiplexed audio and video streams are stored in EVO container format.

Audio
The HD DVD format supports encoding in up to 24-bit/192 kHz for two channels, or up to eight channels of up to 24-bit/96 kHz encoding.

All HD DVD players are required to decode uncompressed linear PCM, Dolby Digital AC-3, Dolby Digital EX, DTS, Dolby Digital Plus E-AC-3 and Dolby TrueHD. A secondary soundtrack, if present, can be stored in any of the aforementioned formats, or in one of the HD DVD optional codecs: DTS-HD High Resolution Audio and DTS-HD Master Audio. For the highest-fidelity audio experience, HD DVD offers content-producers the choice of LPCM, Dolby TrueHD and DTS-HD Master Audio.

Video
HD DVD video can be encoded using VC-1, H.264/MPEG-4 AVC, or H.262/MPEG-2 Part 2. A wide variety of resolutions are supported, from low-resolution CIF, all SDTV resolutions supported by DVD-Video, and HDTV formats: 720p, 1080i, and 1080p. All studio-released movie titles have featured video in a 1080-line format, with companion supplements in 480i or 480p. The vast majority of releases were encoded with VC-1, and most of the remaining titles encoded with H.264/MPEG-4 AVC.

Digital rights management

If a publisher wishes to restrict use of its HD DVD content, it may use the Advanced Access Content System (AACS) although this is not required for normal disc playback. AACS is a standard for content distribution and digital rights management. It is developed by AACS Licensing Administrator, LLC (AACS LA), a consortium that includes Disney, Intel, Microsoft, Panasonic, Warner Bros., IBM, Toshiba and Sony. One of the advantages over CSS, the content restriction system for DVDs, is that AACS allows content providers to revoke an individual player device model if its cryptographic keys have been compromised (meaning that it will not be able to decrypt subsequently released content). There is no Region Coding in the existing HD DVD specification, which means that titles from any country can be played in players in any other country.

Since appearing in devices in 2006, several successful attacks have been made on the format. The first known attack relied on the trusted client problem. In addition, decryption keys have been extracted from a weakly protected player (WinDVD). Notably, a Processing Key was found that could be used to decrypt all HD content that had been released at the time. The processing key was widely published on the Internet after it was found and the AACS LA sent multiple DMCA takedown notices with the aim of censoring it. This caused trouble on some sites that rely on user-submitted content, like Digg and Wikipedia, when administrators tried to remove any mentions of the key.

AACS has also been circumvented by SlySoft with their program AnyDVD HD, which allows users to watch HD DVD movies on non-HDCP-compliant PC hardware. SlySoft has stated that AnyDVD HD uses several different mechanisms to disable the encryption, and is not dependent on the use of a single compromised encryption key.
Other AACS circumvention programs have become available, like DVDFab HD Decrypter.

Interactive content
HD DVDs use Advanced Content to allow interactive content to be authored for discs. Microsoft's implementation of Advanced Content is the HDi Interactive Format, and "HDi" is frequently used to refer to the Advanced Content system. Advanced Content is based on web technologies such as HTML, XML, CSS, SMIL, and ECMAScript (JavaScript), so authoring in Advanced Content should be a fairly easy transition for web developers. No existing DVD authoring experience is required. In comparison, Blu-ray Disc content is authored using either a scripting environment (BDMV) or a Java-based platform (BD-J). DVD video discs use pre-rendered MPEG segments, selectable subtitle pictures, and simple programmatic navigation which is considerably more limited.

Hardware

Compatibility
Backward compatibility is available with all HD DVD players, allowing users to have a single player to play all types of HD DVD, DVD and CD. There is also a hybrid HD DVD format which contains both DVD and HD DVD versions of the same movie on a single disc, providing a smooth transition for the studios in terms of publishing movies, and allowing consumers with only DVD players to still use the discs. DVD replication companies can continue using their current production equipment with only minor alterations when changing over to the format of HD DVD replication. Due to the structure of the single-lens optical head, both red and blue laser diodes can be used in smaller, more compact HD DVD players. However, HD DVD discs can't be played on standard DVD players.

General purpose computers
HD DVD drives can also be used with a desktop/laptop personal computer (PC) running Windows XP, Windows Vista, Mac OS X v10.5 "Leopard", and many varieties of Linux. Third-party player software for Windows and Linux have successfully played HD DVD titles using the add-on drive.

Released at the end of November 2006, the Microsoft HD DVD drive for the Xbox 360 game-console gives the Xbox 360 the ability to play HD DVD movies. The drive was announced with an MSRP of US$199 and includes a USB 2.0 cable for connection to the console. The first drives also included Peter Jackson's King Kong or Christopher Nolan's Batman Begins on HD DVD. The final "regular" for the drive was US$129.99 as of February 25, 2008. On February 23, 2008 Microsoft discontinued the Xbox 360 HD DVD player. On February 26, 2008, Microsoft "officially" announced that the Xbox 360 HD DVD add on drive would reflect a heavily discounted price down to $49.99.

Dual-compatibility drives

In 2007, LG and Samsung released standalone consumer players that could read both HD DVD and Blu-ray Discs. The machines were sold at premium prices, but failed to sell in large quantities. In May 2008, both companies announced they would stop manufacturing dual-compatibility drives.

A few computer manufacturers (such as HP and Acer) sold computers with combination HD DVD/Blu-ray Disc drives. LG marketed a Blu-ray writer that also read HD DVD discs (but could not write to them).

HD DVD / Blu-ray Disc comparison

HD DVD competed primarily with Blu-ray Disc. Both formats were designed as successors to DVD, capable of higher quality video and audio playback, and of greater capacity when used to store video, audio, and computer data. Blu-ray Disc and HD DVD share most of the same methods of encoding media onto discs with each other, resulting in equivalent levels of audio and visual quality, but differ in other aspects such as interactive capabilities, internet integration, usage control and enforcement, and in which features were mandatory for players. The storage size also varies: A dual-layer HD DVD holds a maximum of 30 GB of data, while a dual-layer Blu-ray Disc carries 50 GB.

Development
Even after finalizing the HD DVD standard, engineers continued developing the technology. A 51 GB triple-layer spec was approved at the DVD Forums 40th Steering Committee Meeting (held on November 15, 2007). No movies had been scheduled for this disc type, and Toshiba had declined to say whether the 51 GB disc was compatible with existing drives and players. Specification 2.0 Part 1 (Physical Specification) for triple layer HD DVD had been approved in November 2007.

At the CES 2007, Ritek revealed their high definition optical disc process that extended both competing high definition formats to ten layers, increasing capacity to 150 GB for HD DVD and 250 GB for Blu-ray Disc. A major obstacle to implementing this technology in either format (150 GB HD DVD will not be developed due to HD DVD's discontinuation) is that reader-writer technology available may not be able to support the additional data layers.

NEC, Broadcom, Horizon Semiconductors, and STMicroelectronics have separately developed a single chip/laser that can read both the HD DVD and the Blu-ray Disc standard. Broadcom and STMicroelectronics will be selling their dual-format single chip/laser solution to any OEM willing to develop a product based on the chip.

Variants and media

HD DVD-R / -RW / -RAM
HD DVD-R is the writable disc variant of HD DVD, available with a single-layer capacity of 15 GB or a dual-layer capacity of 30 GB. Write speeds depend on drive speed, with a data rate of 36.55 Mbit/s (4.36 MB/s) and a recording time of 56 minutes for 1× media, and 73 Mbit/s (8.71 MB/s) and a recording time of 28 minutes for 2×.

The Toshiba SD-L902A for notebooks was one of the first available HD DVD writers, although it was not meant for retail. Burning HD DVD (including Dual Layer) with a 1× write speed, it could also burn DVDs and CDs. In a test of the SD-L902A by C't computer magazine with Verbatim discs, the written HD DVD-Rs suffered from high noise levels, as a result, the written discs could not be recognized by the external HD DVD drive of the Xbox 360, though they could be read back by the SD-L902A.

HD DVD-RW is the rewritable disc variant of HD DVD with equal storage capacity to an HD DVD-R. The primary advantage of HD DVD-RW over HD DVD-R is the ability to erase and rewrite to an HD DVD-RW disc, up to about 1,000 times before needing replacement, making them comparable with the CD-RW and DVD-RW standards. This is also of benefit if there are writing errors when recording data, as the disc is not ruined and can still store data by erasing the faulty data. The dual-layer variant was never released and the single-layer variant was, but it is among the rarest of optical media.

HD DVD-RAM was the proposed successor to DVD-RAM for random access on optical media using phase-change principals. It would hold 20 gigabytes per layer instead of 15 gigabytes for HD DVD-R, due to differences in recording methods used, yielding a higher density disc. This variant of HD DVD was never released.

DVD / HD DVD hybrid discs
There are two types of hybrid formats which contain standard DVD-Video format video for playback in regular DVD players, and HD DVD video for playback in high definition on HD DVD players. The Combo disc is a dual sided disc with one side DVD and the other HD DVD, each of which can have up to two layers. The Twin disc is a single sided disc that can have up to three layers, with up to two layers dedicated to either DVD or HD DVD. These hybrid discs make retail marketing and shelf space management easier. Another advantage is hardware cross-compatibility. The average consumer does not have to worry about whether or not they can play a hybrid DVD: any standard home DVD player can access the DVD-encoded content and any HD DVD player can access both the DVD- and HD DVD-encoded content.

HD DVD / Blu-ray Disc hybrid discs
Warner Bros. officially announced Total Hi Def (THD or Total HD) at CES 2007. THD hybrid discs were to support both HD DVD and Blu-ray Disc, with HD DVD on one side (up to two layers) and Blu-ray Disc on the other side (up to two layers). In November 2007, Warner Bros. cancelled THD's development.

3× DVD
The HD DVD format also applies to current red laser DVDs; this type of disc is called "3× DVD", as it is capable of three times the bandwidth of regular DVD-Video.

3× DVDs are physically identical to normal DVDs. Although 3× DVDs provide the same high definition content, their playback time is less. For example, an 8.5 GB DVD DL can hold about 90 minutes of 1080p video encoded with VC-1 or AVC at an average bitrate of 12 Mbit/s, which corresponds with the average length of Hollywood feature-films. If quality is compromised slightly, and good compression techniques are used, most feature films could be encoded with 3× DVD. Due to its much greater resolution, HD-Video also has significantly more redundant information than DVD which newer compression standards can encode more efficiently.

It is technically possible for consumers to create HD DVD compatible discs using low cost DVD-R or DVD+R media. At least one such guide exists. The 3× DVD is comparable to Blu-ray Disc BD5 and BD9 formats.

HD REC
HD Rec is an extension of the HD DVD format for recording HD content on regular red laser DVD-Rs/DVD-RWs using H.264/MPEG-4 AVC compression. It was approved by the DVD Forum on September 12, 2007 It is comparable to Blu-ray Disc's AVCREC.

CBHD 
The China Blue High-definition Disc (CBHD), a high-definition optical disc format, was based upon the HD DVD format. Like the HD DVD, CBHD discs have a capacity of 15 GB single-layer and 30 GB dual-layer and can use existing DVD production lines.

See also 
 1080p, high-definition resolution supported by HD DVD and Blu-ray Disc.
 Advanced Interactivity Consortium
 Comparison of popular optical data-storage systems
 Dolby Digital Plus, one of the mandatory audio codecs for HD DVD hardware
 HD NVD
 High definition optical disc format war
 MUSE LD – an earlier optical disc which contained analog HDTV signals
 List of optical disc manufacturers

Alternative disc technologies 
 3D optical data storage – another next-generation technology
 AVCHD
 Blu-ray Disc
 Digital Multilayer Disk
 Enhanced Versatile Disc (EVD)
 Fluorescent Multilayer Disc
 Forward Versatile Disc (FVD)
 LS-R – a "layer selection" technology designed to allow large numbers of data layers in one disc.
 Professional Disc for DATA (PDD or ProDATA)
 Ultra Density Optical
 Versatile Multilayer Disc

Notes

References 

 
Products and services discontinued in 2008
Audio storage
Audiovisual introductions in 2006
Consumer electronics
Discontinued media formats
DVD
High-definition television
Rotating disc computer storage media
Optical computer storage media